In ancient Roman religion, Pales was a deity of shepherds, flocks and livestock. Regarded as male by some sources and female by others, Pales can be either singular or plural in Latin, and refers at least once to a pair of deities.

Pales' festival, called the Parilia, was celebrated on April 21. Cattle were driven through bonfires on this day. Pales and the Parilia were strictly connected to the foundation of Rome which took place on the day of their festival.

Marcus Atilius Regulus built a temple to Pales in Rome following his victory over the Salentini in 267 BC. It is generally thought to have been located on the Palatine Hill, but, being a victory monument, it may have been located on the route of the triumphal procession, either on the Campus Martius or the Aventine Hill. According to the Fasti Antiates Maiores, there was a festival for "the two Pales" (Palibus duobus) on July 7, probably to mark the dedication of this temple.

Scholarship has suggested the Pales deities are related to Sicilian pair of gods Palici, and both sets of brother may be reflexes of the Indo-European mytheme of the Divine twins.

References

Sources
Richardson, L. (1992). A New Topographical Dictionary of Ancient Rome. Baltimore and London: The Johns Hopkins University Press. (p. 282)
Scullard, H.H. (1981). Festivals and Ceremonies of the Roman Republic. London: Thames and Hudson. (p. 104–105)

Roman gods
Roman goddesses
Agricultural deities
Roman deities